António Montez may refer to:

 António Montez (sports shooter) (1885-1968), Portuguese sports shooter
 António Montez (footballer) (born 2001), Portuguese footballer